The SIG Sauer SIG516 is a semi-automatic rifle manufactured by SIG Sauer. It is an AR-15 style rifle chambered in 5.56×45mm NATO. Introduced in 2010, the SIG516 was discontinued as of 2019. A variant chambered in 7.62x51mm NATO, the SIG716i, remains in production.

Design details

Operating mechanism

The SIG516 is a semi-automatic multi-caliber rifle. It fires from a closed bolt, and has a short-stroke push rod piston system. The gas piston pushes the bolt carrier rearward, where it is returned to the forward and locked position by a spring. This process loads the next cartridge. The 516 has a four-position gas regulator, allowing the user to choose the amount of gas directed to the piston.

Features
The SIG516 has a safety lever on the left side, to be used by the thumb of the shooting hand. The gas block integrates an adjustable gas regulator. The front gas block is railed to accept the front sight with a flip-up sight post. SIG516 models are equipped with an M16A2 style bird-cage flash hider.

All SIG516 models except the Marksman are equipped with  barrels shrouded by a free-floating M1913 Picatinny rail, as well as flip-up iron sights (BUIS) made by SIG Sauer.

The 5.56×45mm NATO SIG516 models accept AR-15 style box magazines. These magazines are constructed in 5-, 10-, 20-, and 30-round variants. SIG516 Russian rifles use a different magazine, as they are chambered in 7.62×39mm. The SIG516 Russian uses magazines designed for 7.62×39mm AR-15 style rifles. The rifle is hammer-fired and has a two-stage trigger mechanism in the SIG516 Marksman, while all others have a military specification single-stage trigger.

It is built to pass the NATO test protocol “Over the Beach”, meaning the SIG516 is designed to fire safely as quickly as possible after being submerged in water.

Variants

SIG716

The SIG716 is battle rifle variant, which is based on the same design, but is chambered for the larger 7.62x51mm NATO round and uses SR-25 pattern magazines.

SIG716 G2
The SIG716 G2 (Generation 2) variant features a short-stroke pushrod gas system. This operating system reduces carbon fouling, excessive heat and unburned powder in the action, ensuring further improved reliability and function. The G2 Patrol model is chambered in 7.62×51mm NATO, while the G2 DMR model is chambered in 6.5mm Creedmoor.

SIG 716i
The 716i (impingement) variant features a direct impingement gas system instead of short-stroke pushrod gas system. This operating system has helped Sig Sauer to bring down the cost of manufacturing and pushing more sales of 716i, while improving weight reduction. The 716i is chambered in 7.62×51mm NATO. Sig Sauer appears to have discontinued SIG716 and SIG716 G2 models, since the company stopped displaying these products in their website, while they continue to sell magazines and spare parts in their online store. The 716i has been recognized as the best AR-10 rifle for the year 2020, by readers' choice voting of Ballistic magazine.

Users

 : Used by Canadian Special Operations Forces Command.
 : Used by Navy El-Sa'ka Forces.
 : In use with the Georgian MIA and MOD special forces
 : Used by the Hong Kong Police Force including the Special Duties Unit and the Counter Terrorism Response Unit.
 : Order placed for 72,400 units of SIG 716i model. In December 2019, the first lot of 10,000 rifles was delivered to the Indian Army’s Northern Command. An additional order for 72,000 rifles was confirmed by SIG Sauer in July 2020. The order for the second batch of 72,000 assault rifles would be coming after the first batch has been delivered. Sig Sauer also confirmed that delivery of the first order has already been completed.
: Used by the Mobile Brigade of the Indonesian National Police, SIG716 G2 used by Indonesian National Armed Forces special forces unit.
 : Transitioning into the general service rifle of the Naval Infantry Force.
 : Used by PTJ (Counter-Terrorist Unit) of Serbian Police
 : Used by the Mobilen Einsatzpolizei of the Aargau Police.
 : Used by Police Special Operation Department and Police Counter Attack Teams
 : Used by Metropolitan Police Counter Terrorist Specialist Firearms Officers (CTSFO) Surrey Police and West Midlands Police
 : Used by Florida Highway Patrol when purchased in 2019, Delaware State Police when purchased in 2012 and also by Cincinnati Police Department SWAT, as well as the Anderson County, South Carolina Sheriff's Office SWAT. San Diego Police Department SWAT, in which the rifles will replace out aging Vietnam era M16s.

See also
 List of semi-automatic rifles

References

External links
 716i TREAD at sigsauer.com
 SIG716G2 PATROL at sigsauer.com

5.56 mm assault rifles
7.62×39mm assault rifles
SIG Sauer rifles
Rifles of Switzerland
Semi-automatic rifles
ArmaLite AR-10 derivatives
Police weapons
Weapons and ammunition introduced in 2010
Short stroke piston firearms